Michelle T. Boone (born July 17, 1961) is an American arts executive.  She is the president of the Poetry Foundation and previously served as Commissioner of Cultural Affairs for the City of Chicago.

References

American arts administrators
Indiana University Bloomington alumni
1961 births
Living people